The 12th Armored Division was an armored division of the United States Army in World War II. It fought in the European Theater of Operations in France, Germany and Austria, between November 1944 and May 1945.

The German Army called the 12th Armored Division the "Suicide Division" for its fierce defensive actions during Operation Nordwind in France, and they were nicknamed the "Mystery Division" when they were temporarily transferred to the command of the Third Army under General George S. Patton Jr., to cross the Rhine River.

The 12th Armored Division was one of only ten U.S. divisions (and only one of two U.S. armored divisions) during World War II that had African-American combat companies integrated into the division. The group was known as Company D. One of the African American soldiers, Staff Sergeant Edward A. Carter Jr. was awarded The Distinguished Service Cross for gallantry in combat during World War II, and was later awarded the Medal of Honor posthumously.

History
The 12th Armored Division was activated on 15 September 1942. Organization and initial training was at Camp Campbell, Kentucky, and continued at Camp Barkeley in Abilene, Texas.  The division consisted of approximately 11,000 soldiers, and was composed of tank, field artillery, motorized infantry battalions and other support units.

In early 1943 the division adopted the nickname "The Hellcats", symbolizing its toughness and readiness for combat.

While at Camp Barkeley, the 44th Tank Battalion was sent to the Pacific Theater of Operations on a special mission and later distinguished itself as the first unit to enter Manila. The 44th was replaced by the 714th Tank Battalion.

Walt Disney himself designed a logo for the 714th Tank Battalion.

Origin of Combat Units
The 12th was originally organized as a heavy armored division with two armored regiments, the 43rd and 44th, and one armored infantry regiment, the 56th Armored Infantry Regiment. In 1943, it was reorganized from a heavy division to a light division as part of a general streamlining of all armored divisions, except the 2nd Armored Division and the 3rd Armored Division.

Tank Battalions
The original 43rd and 44th Armored Regiments assigned to the 12th AD were re-designated to become the 23rd, 43rd, 44th, 714th and 779th Tank Battalions during the reorganization the division underwent while at the Tennessee Maneuver Area in Watertown, Tennessee, in November 1943. The 714th Tank Battalion was sent to Fort Jackson, SC and the 779th Tank Battalion went to Fort Knox, KY as separate tank battalions. The 44th Tank Battalion was detached from the 12th AD and sent to the Pacific Theater of Operations, where it distinguished itself as the first tank battalion to enter the city of Manila and liberated American and Allied civilian prisoners interred in the Santo Tomas Internment Camp. It was replaced by the 714th Tank Battalion, which rejoined the 12th AD in November 1943. The 779th Tank Battalion was sent to the Philippines late in the war, but did not see any combat action.

Armored Infantry Battalions
The 56th Armored Infantry Regiment (AIR) traced its historical origin back to the 17th Infantry Regiment of Maj. Gen. George Sykes' 2nd Division of the 5th Army Corps, of the Army of the Potomac during the American Civil War. During World War I, soldiers from the reconstituted 17th Infantry Regiment were used to form the 56th Infantry Regiment on 15 May 1917, which was involved in the battle around Metz in Alsace-Lorraine.  On 7 July 1942, the unit was reactivated as the 56th Armored Infantry Regiment and assigned to the 12th Armored Division, which was activated as a division at Camp Campbell, KY on 15 September 1942. On 11 November 1943 while at Watertown, Tennessee, the 12th Armored Division was reorganized and the 56th Armored Infantry Regiment was reorganized to form the 17th, 56th and 66th Armored Infantry Battalions (AIB).
The 1st Battalion of the 56th AIR became the 66th AIB and the 2nd Battalion of the 56th AIR became the 17th AIB of the 12th Armored Division. The 3rd Battalion of the 56th AIR became the 56th AIB. Companies G, H and I of the 56th AIR became Companies A, B and C of the 56th AIB.

Ironically, when reconstituted as the 56th Armored Infantry Battalion during World War II, they were back in Alsace-Lorraine, fighting with the 12th Armored Division to liberate the same region of France from Nazi occupation in 1944-1945.

World War II

Combat chronicle

After completing training the division left Abilene and departed from Camp Shanks, New York, for the European Theater of Operations on 20 September 1944. It landed at Liverpool, England on 2 October 1944. While awaiting replacement armor which had been borrowed by the U.S. Third Army, the 12th was sent to Tidworth Barracks in Wiltshire, UK. It crossed the English Channel from Southampton, arrived at Le Havre, France, on 11 November 1944 and then traveled up the Seine River to Rouen to join the Seventh Army under Lieutenant General Alexander Patch.  Advance elements met the enemy near Weisslingen in Alsace on 5 December, and the entire division moved against the Maginot Line fortifications two days later.

In its advance, Rohrbach-lès-Bitche and towns surrounding Bettviller were liberated by 12 December 1944, and Utweiler, Germany was seized on 21 December. After a short period of rehabilitation and maintenance, the 12th rolled against the Rhine bridgehead at Herrlisheim that the Germans had established as part of their Operation Nordwind offensive. In order to seal the Battle of the Bulge, units of the Seventh Army were diverted north to assist the Third Army in capturing Bastogne.

German defenders repulsed two division attacks in the most violent combat in the history of the division, during 8 to 10 January and 16 to 17 January 1945. The division's attacks at Herrlisheim failed to use combined-arms tactics and were defeated in detail, resulting in two tank and two armored infantry battalions taking heavy losses. Poor tactics were compounded by terrain that was almost tabletop-flat, offering the German defenders excellent fields of fire. However, enemy counterattacks also failed, in part because of the firm leadership of the commander of Combat Command B, Colonel Charles Bromley, who declared his headquarters expendable and ordered all personnel in the headquarters to prepare a hasty defense.

The division was subsequently relieved by the U.S. 36th Infantry Division. The 12th Armored Division suffered over 1,700 battle casualties during the fighting in and around Herrlisheim. As a consequence, when African-American soldiers who were in non-combat positions were able to volunteer to become combat troops, Major General Roderick R. Allen was one of only ten division commanders who allowed them to join the combat ranks.  After recovering from the bruising experience at Herrlisheim, the 12th went over to the offensive and attacked south from Colmar, after being assigned to the French First Army under General Jean de Lattre de Tassigny. In a lightning drive, the 12th effected junction with French forces at Rouffach, on 5 February, sealing the Colmar Pocket and ending German resistance in the Vosges Mountains. Except for elements acting as a protective screen, the division withdrew to the St. Avold area for rest and rehabilitation. The division was attached to the Third Army under General George S. Patton Jr. from 17 March 1945 through its crossing of the Rhine on 28 March. The soldiers were ordered to remove their identifying unit insignias, and vehicle markings were painted over, disguising the fact that Patton had an additional armored division under his command. Thus the 12th was given the nickname the "Mystery Division". The attack resumed on 18 March 1945.

In a quick drive to the Rhine, Ludwigshafen fell on 21 March, and two other important river cities, Speyer and Germersheim, were secured on 24 March, clearing the Saar Palatinate. Maintaining the rapid pace, the 12th crossed the Rhine River at Worms on 28 March over pontoon bridges, advanced toward Würzburg, and captured that city along with elements of the famed 42nd Infantry Division (United States). After assisting in the seizure of Schweinfurt, the division continued toward Nuremberg on 13 April, taking Neustadt, then shifted south toward Munich on 17 April. Elements of the 12th raced from Dinkelsbühl to the Danube, where they found the bridge at Lauingen had been blown. Moving quickly they captured the bridge at Dillingen intact before demolition men could destroy it. This bridge provided a vital artery for Allied troops flooding into southern Bavaria.

The division spearheaded the Seventh Army drive, securing Landsberg, on 27 April and clearing the area between the Ammer and Würm Lakes by 30 April. The 12th Armored Division is recognized as a liberating unit of the Landsberg concentration camps near the Landsberg Prison, sub-camps of Dachau concentration camp on 27 April 1945. On 29 April 1945, the 12th AD liberated Oflag VII-A Murnau, a German Army POW camp for Polish Army officers interned north of the Bavarian town of Murnau am Staffelsee during World War II. 

Elements crossed the Inn River and the Austrian border at Kufstein on 3 May. The 12th Armored Division was relieved by the 36th Infantry Division on 4 May. On 5 May, Lieutenant (later Captain) John C. Lee Jr., Co. B, 23rd Tank Battalion, organized the rescue of VIP French prisoners from an Alpine castle in Bavaria during the Battle for Castle Itter. Under Lee's command were members of the German Wehrmacht, who combined forces with 2 tanks from the 12th to fight the SS Commander and soldiers guarding the prisoners.  For leading the successful rescue of these prisoners, Lee was promoted to captain and awarded the Distinguished Service Cross.

The 12th Armored Division engaged in security duty around Ulm until 22 November 1945, when it left Marseille, France, for home. Some members of the 12th attended the US Army University, in either Biarritz, France or Shrivenham, England during this time.

It was deactivated on 3 December 1945, and on 17 December 1945, its battle flags were turned in at Camp Kilmer, New Jersey.

POWs captured

During its deployment the 12th Armored Division captured 72,243 enemy prisoners of war. Among them were Adolf Eichmann and Wernher von Braun.

Nearly 8,500 Allied POWs, including 1,500 Americans, and an additional 20,000 non-military prisoners, were liberated by the 12th AD.

War Crimes 
During the liberation of Lippach on 22 April 1945, the 23rd Tank Battalion, 3rd Provisional company executed  prisoners of war and raped over a dozen women in the village.  see: Lippach massacre.

Casualties
Total 12th Armored Division complement: 10,937 at end of 1944;
17,000 assigned to the division between activation and deactivation

Total battle casualties: 3,527
Killed in action: 616
Wounded in action: 2,416
Missing in action: 17
Prisoner of war: 478

Composition 
The division was composed of the following units:

 Headquarters Company
 Combat Command A
 Combat Command B
 Reserve Command
 23rd Tank Battalion
 43rd Tank Battalion
 44th Tank Battalion - detached and sent to the Pacific, replaced by the 714th Tank Battalion
 714th Tank Battalion - detached from the division to be a separate tank battalion and later returned to replace the detached 44th Tank Battalion 
 17th Armored Infantry Battalion
 56th Armored Infantry Battalion
 66th Armored Infantry Battalion
 92nd Cavalry Reconnaissance Squadron (Mechanized)
 119th Armored Engineer Battalion
 12th Armored Division Artillery
 493nd Armored Field Artillery Battalion
 494th Armored Field Artillery Battalion
 495th Armored Field Artillery Battalion
 12th Armored Division Trains
 152nd Armored Signal Company
 134th Armored Ordnance Maintenance Battalion
 82nd Armored Medical Battalion
 Military Police Platoon
 Band

Awards
 Campaigns: Rhineland, Ardennes-Alsace, Central Europe.
 Days of combat: 102
 Distinguished Unit Citations: 1 - 92nd Cavalry Reconnaissance Squadron, Mechanized
 Meritorious Unit Citation: 3, to the 134th Ordnance Maintenance Battalion (with a star in addition); 82d Armored Medical Battalion; and 152d Armored Signal Company
Division authorized by France to incorporate Arms of the City of Colmar in its division insignia for action in liberating the city.

Individual awards:
 Medal of Honor: 1 - Edward A. Carter Jr.
 Distinguished Service Cross: 6
 Silver Star: 198
 Legion of Merit: 4
 Distinguished Flying Cross: 3
 Soldier's Medal: 12
 Bronze Star Medal: 1,199 (does not include Bronze Stars issued to awardees of Combat Infantry Badges or Combat Medical Badges)
 Air Medal: 50

Commanders
 Major General Carlos Brewer (September 1942 – August 1944)
 Major General Douglass T. Greene (August–September 1944)
 Major General Roderick R. Allen (September 1944 – July 1945)
 Brigadier General Willard Ames Holbrook Jr. (July 1945 to inactivation)

Assignments in the European Theater of Operations
 13 November 1944: Ninth Army, Twelfth Army Group
 5 December 1944: XV Corps, Seventh Army, Sixth Army Group.
 27 December 1944: XXI Corps.
 30 December 1944: Seventh Army, 6th Army Group.
 3 January 1945: XV Corps.
 6 January 1945: VI Corps.
 3 February 1945: XXI Corps.
 11 February 1945: XV Corps.
 28 February 1945: XXI Corps.
 17 March 1945: Seventh Army, 6th Army Group, but attached to the XX Corps, Third Army, Twelfth Army Group.
 24 March 1945: XXI Corps, Seventh Army, 6th Army Group.
 26 March 1945: XV Corps.
 31 March 1945: XXI Corps.
 4 May 1945: Seventh Army, 6th Army Group.

Assignments of the 12th AD to Higher Commands
Date 	Assigned to Corps 	Assigned to Army 	Attached to Army 	Assigned to Army Group 	Attached to Army Group
07.10.1944 	  	  	UK Base 	ETOUSA
13.11.1944 	  	Ninth Army 	  	12th Army Group
05.12.1944 	XV Operations 	Seventh Army 	  	6th Army Group
27.12.1944 	XXI Operations 	Seventh Army 	  	6th Army Group
30.12.1944 	  	Seventh Army 	  	6th Army Group
03.01.1945 	XV Corps 	Seventh Army 	  	6th Army Group
06.01.1945 	VI Corps 	Seventh Army 	  	6th Army Group
03.02.1945 	XXI Corps 	Seventh Army 	  	6th Army Group
11.02.1945 	XV Corps 	Seventh Army 	  	6th Army Group
28.02.1945 	XXI Corps 	Seventh Army 	  	6th Army Group
17.03.1945 	XX Operations 	Third Army,6th Army Gp 	12th Army Group
24.03.1945 	XXI Corps 	Seventh Army 	  	6th Army Group
26.03.1945 	XV Corps 	Seventh Army 	  	6th Army Group
31.03.1945 	XXI Corps 	Seventh Army 	  	6th Army Group
04.05.1945 	  	        Seventh Army 	  	6th Army Group

Detachments of units of the 12th Armored Division to other Commands

Attachments (Units officially attached to the 12th Armored Division) 
 572nd Anti-aircraft Artillery (AAA) AW (automatic weapons) Battalion (SP) (self-propelled) 	04.12.1944-18.05.1945
 CC V, 2nd French Armored Division			30.04.1945-04.05.1945
 101st Cavalry Group		08.04.1945-04.05.1945
 42nd Reconnaissance Troop, 42nd Infantry Division 	13.04.1945-14.04.1945
 99th Chemical Mortar Battalion, A Company,		07.03.1945-08.03.1945
 206th Engineer Combat Battalion 				18.03.1945-20.03.1945
 256th Engineer Combat Battalion 				14.04.1945-21.04.1945
 290th Engineer Combat Battalion 				21.04.1945-04.05.1945
 204th Field Artillery Group 				18.03.1945-22.03.1945
 342nd Field Artillery Battalion 				28.03.1945-04.05.1945
 933rd Field Artillery Battalion (155mm Howitzer) 	31.03.1945-19.04.1945
 36th Field Artillery Group, Headquarters 			01.04.1945-19.04.1945
 937th Field Artillery Battalion (155mm Howitzer) 	01.04.1945-04.05.1945
 935th Field Artillery Battalion (4.5 inch Gun) 		11.04.1945-19.04.1945
 977th Field Artillery Battalion, A Batt (155mm Gun) 	24.04.1945-25.04.1945
 1st & 2nd Bn, 22nd Infantry Reg, 4th Infantry Division 	02.04.1945-03.04.1945
 3rd Bn, 222nd Infantry Reg, 42nd Infantry Division 	02.04.1945-08.04.1945
 2nd Bn, 242nd Infantry Reg, 42nd Infantry Division 	05.04.1945-07.04.1945
 G Co, 242nd Infantry Reg, 42nd Infantry Division 	10.04.1945-12.04.1945
 3rd Bn, 242nd Infantry Reg, 42nd Infantry Division 	12.04.1945-14.04.1945
 15th CT, 3rd Infantry Division 				24.04.1945-25.04.1945
 827th Tank Destroyer Battalion 				19.12.1944-13.02.1945

Memorials Recognizing the 12th Armored Division
12th Armored Division Fort Campbell Memorial, Fort Campbell, Kentucky
12th Armored Division Camp Barkeley Memorial, Abilene, Texas
12th Armored Division Memorial Museum, Abilene, Texas
All Veterans Memorial, 12th AD Plaque, Emporia, Kansas
Armored Park Memorial, Fort Knox, Kentucky
Armed Forces Monument, Arlington, Virginia
Don F. Pratt Memorial Museum, Fort Campbell, KY
United States Holocaust Museum, Washington, DC
50th Anniversary of World War II Memorial, Herrlisheim, France (12th AD is the only Allied Military Unit recognized on the Monument)
Memorial to Liberation of France and Victory in World War II, Colmar, France
Place de Col. Meigs plaque, Rohrbach, France
US Memorial on Hill 351 (Mont de Sigolsheim), Sigolsheim, France

12th Armored Division Association
The 12th Armored Division Association was founded on 15 September 1945 at Heidenheim, Germany, on the occasion of the third anniversary of the division's activation.
Website: https://sites.google.com/view/12tharmoreddivisionassociation

The Hellcat News (newspaper)
The Hellcat News, the newspaper of the 12th Armored Division, was first published in 1942 as an information sheet. Initial publication was part of the public relations duties of the Special Services unit of the 12th Armored Division while the division trained at Camp (later Fort) Campbell, Kentucky. In 1943, after the division was transferred to Camp Barkeley in Abilene, Texas, the division commander, Major General Carlos Brewer, assigned three men to Special Services to continue the newspaper.
The first official issue of the newspaper was published at Camp Campbell, Kentucky, although the byline reads "Somewhere in Tennessee".  This was because Camp Campbell was in the Tennessee Maneuver Area located on the Kentucky-Tennessee border between Hopkinsville, Kentucky, and Clarksville, Tennessee. Due to its close proximity to Clarksville, Tennessee, the War Department on 6 March 1942, designated Tennessee as the official address of the new camp. This caused a great deal of confusion, since the Headquarters was in Tennessee and the post office was in Kentucky. After many months of mail delivery problems, Colonel Guy W. Chipman requested that the address be changed to Camp Campbell, Kentucky. The U.S. War Department officially changed the address on 23 September 1942.

The newspaper continued to be published by the division Special Services after transfer of the division to Camp Barkeley in Abilene, Texas, from February 1944 through the final issue published in the U.S during the war on 10 August 1944 (Vol. 2, No. 26), when the entire division was shipped to Europe to join the 7th Army in France. Publication resumed with Volume 3, Issue 1 on 18 May 1945, in Heidenheim, Germany, following cessation of combat operations in the ETO. The Special Services of the division published the first issues in Europe on a weekly basis when conditions permitted, until the deactivation of the division in 1946.
The Hellcat News is one of two U.S. military newspapers that has been continuously published since World War 2, the other being the older "Stars and "Stripes", which began publication on 9 November 1861 in Bloomfield, Missouri. The "Hellcat News" is the oldest U.S. Armed Forces divisional newspaper still being published since World War 2.

Content
Wartime publications contained division news stories, cartoons and photographs. The later editions of the 12th Armored Association contain information about former members of the division, organizational news including information about the yearly reunion, original cartoons, and photographs both from the war years and afterwards. A series relating the history of the division is also recounted in the newspaper. In addition, the president of the association and the secretary included messages of interest in most issues. These messages contain information about the division's Medal of Honor recipient, Staff Sergeant Edward A. Carter Jr.
The Hellcat News is published by the 12th Armored Division Association. Archived copies of the Hellcat News from the first issue in 1943 through 2012 are available online through the West Texas Digital Archive.

12th Armored Division Memorial Museum

In October 2001 the 12th Armored Division Memorial Museum opened its doors to the public in Abilene, Texas, with the stated mission to serve as a display and teaching museum for the study of World War II and its impact on the American people.
"The Twelfth Armored Division Memorial Museum is located in Abilene, Texas, near (northeast of) the site of the former Camp Barkeley where the Division trained prior to being sent overseas into the European Theater of Operations. The Museum holds collections of the 12th Armored Division, World War II archives, memorabilia, and oral histories, along with selected equipment and material loaned or donated by others. The education plan focuses on expanding academic access to World War II historical materials, veterans, and their families; preserving the history of the 12th Armored Division for study, research, and investigations by future generations; providing training in public history professions, developing new education programs for students and establishing a technology bridge between the 12th Armored Division Historical Collection and the public."

Website: https://www.12tharmoreddivisionmuseum.com/

As part of an ongoing venture to become a larger part of the West Texas community and the greater Abilene area, 12th Armored Division Memorial Museum has partnered with the West Texas Digital Archives, providing access to copies of the "Hellcat News" from first edition to 2012.

This Website ("Humans of the 12th Armored") Accesses the Texas Archives from the Roster of the Veterans from the 12th Armored Museum Website:
https://12th-armored.directory/

See also

56th Infantry Regiment (United States) - an independent regiment prior to World War II that was integrated into the 12th AD
549th Engineer Light Ponton Company - an African-American combat engineer unit which provided support to the 12th Armored Division
827th Tank Destroyer Battalion - a tank battalion temporarily assigned to the 12th AD
Battle for Castle Itter
Colmar Pocket
Operation Nordwind
Operation Undertone
Seventh United States Army
Montgomery Cunningham Meigs (1919–1944)
Lippach massacre - A war crime committed by the 12th Armored Division on 22 April 1945

Notable Veterans
Harry Glickman
Edward A. Carter Jr.
Irving Kristol
Adolph Matulis
Jimmie Reese

Notes

References

External links
12th Armored Division Museum : a museum honoring the division
12th Armored Division Association official website 
12th Armored Division Association Organization Facebook page
U.S. Army Center of Military History
Roger Cirillo, U.S. Army Center of Military History, Campaigns of World War II: A World War II Commemorative Series – Ardennes-Alsace (CMH Pub 72-26). GPO S/N: 008-029-00511-5.
Bernard L. Rice, Recollections of a World War II Combat Medic. Indiana Magazine of History, No. 93 (December, 1997). Pages 312- 344. 
Joseph Driscoll. Mystery Division at Rhine: Patton's Forces Chasing Germans on Road Back. New York Herald-Tribune, 22 March 1945..
David P. Colley. African American Platoons in World War II. Originally published by World War II magazine. Published Online: 20 October 2006

Further reading
Phibbs, Brendan (2002) Our war for the world : a memoir of life and death on the front lines in WWII. Lyons Press, Guilford, Conn. , originally published as: Phibbs, Brendan (1987, 1st ed.) The other side of time : a combat surgeon in World War II. Little, Brown, Boston.  , a combat surgeon in the 12th Armored Division, covers the division's experiences in Europe. The book has been called "one of the best five Allied memoirs of the World War II".
Van Ells, Mark D. ed., (2009) The Daily Life of an Ordinary American Soldier in World War II: The Letters of Wilbur C. Berget.  Edwin Mellen Press, Lewiston. .
Speed is the Password: The Story of the 12th Armored Division
Ferguson, John C. (2004, 1st ed.) Hellcats: The 12th Armored Division in World War II. (Military History of Texas Series). State House Press, Abilene, Tex. 
Monroe-Jones, Edward (2010) Crossing the Zorn: The January 1945 Battle at Herrlisheim as Told by the American and German Soldiers Who Fought It. McFarland, Jefferson, N.C. 

12th Armored Division, U.S.
Armored Division, U.S. 12th
Military units and formations established in 1942
1942 establishments in the United States
Military units and formations disestablished in 1945
1942 establishments in Kentucky